Moe's was a bar in Fort Greene, Brooklyn that closed in 2011.

History
Opened in a former tailor's shop in June 2001 by Ruby Lawrence and Chelsea Altman, the bar was popular and unusual in aggressively gentrifying post-Giuliani New York City in that it attracted an extremely mixed crowd, racially, gender-wise, and socially. New York magazine found it so racially diverse they quipped "they should shoot an after-school special here." The Village Voice called it a "nightlife crucible for the colliding worlds of old-school Fort Greene, urban bohemianism, and yuppification." 

The bar's bi-level space was decorated with thrift-store furnishings, a vibrating chair, and a dance floor in the back. The namesake from The Simpsons was honored with a drink special and a poster in the bathroom. Local celebrities such as Jeffrey Wright, Mos Def, and Common were known to have stopped by on occasion.

Closing

Moe's closed at the end of April 2011 due to rising rent, and hundreds packed its closing. The new renters controversially named the new bar that took its place Mo's.

References

External links
 Photo of Moe's at 2010 closing
 YouTube video of Moe's during night of 2008 Obama election victory

Drinking establishments in New York City
Fort Greene, Brooklyn